Haemanota hermieri is a moth of the family Erebidae. It was described by Hervé de Toulgoët in 2000. It is found in French Guiana.

References

 

Haemanota
Moths described in 2000